Rolf Toft (born 4 August 1992) is a Danish footballer who plays for Danish amateur club Brønderslev IF.

Career
He made his professional debut for AaB in the Superliga when substituted in against OB on 23 October 2011.

References

External links
 

1992 births
Living people
Danish men's footballers
AaB Fodbold players
Danish Superliga players
Knattspyrnufélagið Víkingur players
Expatriate footballers in Iceland
Danish expatriates in Iceland
Danish expatriate sportspeople in Iceland
Stjarnan players
Association football forwards